This article lists the episodes and short summaries of the original Ranma ½ anime series, known in the English dub as the first season of Ranma ½ or "Digital Dojo".

An anime adaptation of Rumiko Takahashi's manga series  debuted on Fuji TV on April 15, 1989. It was canceled due to low ratings after only 18 episodes, with the last airing on September 16, 1989. However, the series was reworked by most of the same staff, retitled  and debuted in December of that same year. It went on to become much more popular, lasting for 143 episodes.

Viz Media licensed both anime for English dubs and labeled them as one. They released them in North America in seven DVD collections they call "seasons". The first Ranma ½ series is season 1, which was given the titled "Digital Dojo".

Episode 13 included a next episode preview to "The Abduction of P-Chan". However, "The Abduction of P-Chan" and the two following episodes that continue the story were not broadcast because of several kidnappings in Japan at the time. This causes a very slight plot hole in episode 15, which includes flashbacks to the then unaired episodes. They were later broadcast as Ranma ½ Nettōhen episodes 7-9. In the Blu-ray release, these three episodes are switched back to episodes 14-16 of the first anime, as originally planned.

The second closing, CoCo's , is used in the final five episodes.



Episode list

References

1989 Japanese television seasons
Season 1